Sarah Lynne Marshall (25 May 1933 – 18 January 2014) was a British actress. She received a nomination for the Tony Award for Best Featured Actress in a Play for her performance in Goodbye Charlie.

Early life 
Marshall was born in London, to actors Edna Best and Herbert Marshall. After her parents divorced, Marshall and her mother moved to Los Angeles.

Career 
Marshall made her Broadway debut in 1951 in a short revival of Elmer Rice's Dream Girl. Her next performances were in three revivals of Robert E. Sherwood plays and a new S.N. Behrman play opposite her mother, all to small audiences. Marshall won a Theatre World Award in 1956 for her role as Bonnie Dee Ponder in the adaptation of Eudora Welty's The Ponder Heart. She was nominated for the Tony Award in 1960 for her role in George Axelrod's play Goodbye Charlie.

Marshall also had a starring role in Alfred Hitchcock Presents as Poopsie (Mrs. Barrett) in "The Baby Blue Expression." Throughout the 1960s, she appeared in a variety of other television series, including The Twilight Zone (episode "Little Girl Lost" (1962) in which she played Ruth, the mother of Tina), The Tab Hunter Show, Thriller, Kentucky Jones, F Troop, Perry Mason, Get Smart, Star Trek (episode ‘’The Deadly Years’’1967), and in one 1966 episode (Doggone Martian) of My Favorite Martian. She guest-starred in three episodes of Daniel Boone:  "Cry of Gold" (1965), "Take the Southbound Stage" (1967) and "Hero's Welcome" (1968).

From the 1970s until shortly before her death, Marshall appeared in numerous television series and in several films. On television, her only full-time regular series role was on the sitcom Miss Winslow & Son in 1979, in which she played Evelyn Winslow, the mother of the series' main character Susan Winslow. Her final film performance was that of Mrs. Weston in Bad Blood...The Hunger, released in 2012.

Personal life 
In June 1952, Marshall married production designer Mel Bourne. They had one child, son Timothy (b. 1954), before divorcing in 1957. In 1964, she married actor Carl Held. They remained together until her death.

Death 
Marshall died on 18 January 2014, after a lengthy battle with cancer. She was 80 years old.

Filmography

References

External links 
 
 

1933 births
2014 deaths
Actresses from London
Actresses from Los Angeles
British expatriate actresses in the United States
British film actresses
British television actresses
Deaths from cancer in California
English emigrants to the United States